Yakshagaanam is a 1976 Indian Malayalam-language horror film directed by Sheela (in her directorial debut) and written by S. L. Puram Sadanandan from a story by Medhavi. The film stars Madhu, Sheela,K.P.Ummer, Adoor Bhasi and Thikkurissy Sukumaran Nair. The film has musical score by M. S. Viswanathan. The film was remade in Telugu as Devude Gelichadu and in Tamil as Aayiram Jenmangal, which went on to be remade as Aranmanai in 2014.

Plot
Dr Venu is an NRI, and his sister is Savitri. During his stay in an estate, he realizes that a spirit has possessed Savitri. To save his sister from the ghost, he seeks his psychiatrist friend for help.

Cast

Madhu
Sheela
Adoor Bhasi
Thikkurissy Sukumaran Nair
Manavalan Joseph
Adoor Pankajam
Adoor Bhavani
Jayakumari
K. P. Ummer
Sadhana
T. K. Balachandran
T. P. Madhavan
Ushanandini

Soundtrack
The music was composed by M. S. Viswanathan and the lyrics were written by Vayalar.

References

External links
 

1976 films
1970s Malayalam-language films
Malayalam films remade in other languages
Films scored by M. S. Viswanathan
Indian horror films
1976 horror films